Vyacheslav Alekseyevich Zapoyaska (born 24 August 1980) is a Ukrainian former professional footballer.

Career
He made his debut in the Russian Premier League in 2002 for FC Sokol Saratov.

External links

1980 births
Living people
Ukrainian footballers
Association football midfielders
Ukrainian expatriate footballers
Expatriate footballers in Russia
Expatriate footballers in Belarus
Russian Premier League players
FC Metalist Kharkiv players
FC Metalist-2 Kharkiv players
FC Sokol Saratov players
FC Partizan Minsk players
FC Volgar Astrakhan players
FC Hazovyk-KhGV Kharkiv players
FC Helios Kharkiv players
FC SKA-Khabarovsk players